Blue Point Brewing Company is a brewery that is a subsidiary of Anheuser-Busch InBev located on Long Island, in Patchogue, New York. The brewery offers a variety of year-round beers, and several seasonal brews, as well as a 'tasting room' which is open to the public on Tuesdays, Wednesdays, Thursdays, Fridays, Saturdays, and Sundays. The brewery hosts an annual Cask Ale Festival, concerts and other events in the brew yard.

History
The brewery was founded in 1998 in a former ice factory by Mark Burford and Pete Cotter, both avid home-brewers at the time. In regards to the decision to open up a brewery, Pete said: "Other parts of the country had local microbreweries and we saw an opportunity for a microbrewery to meet the demand in the market between Montauk and Manhattan."

Blue Point Brewing Company's flagship Toasted Lager won a gold medal at the 2006 World Beer Cup in the American-Style Amber Lager category.

On February 5, 2014, it was announced that Blue Point was being sold to Anheuser-Busch InBev for nearly $24 million. At the time of acquisition the brewery was distributed in 19 states as well as Washington D.C. The brewery continues to operate in Patchogue, NY, but has moved from the small facility and single tasting room on River Avenue to a 54,000 sq.ft. building at 225 West Main Street, previously used by Briarcliff College.

See also
Barrel-aged beer

References

External links 
 

 Company Blog
 The Foaming Head's Blue Point Page
 Tour of the brewery with photos
 The Beer Hall Guide to Long Island's Blue Point

AB InBev
Companies based in Suffolk County, New York
Beer brewing companies based in New York (state)